Ursula Merkin (1919–2006) was a German-born American philanthropist.

Life and career
She was born in Frankfurt, Germany to Isaac Breuer, a noted German Rabbi, as Ursula (Sara) Breuer. In 1933, at the age of fourteen, she left Germany with her family for Palestine. She remained there with her father, to whom she was very close, until his death in Jerusalem in 1946, at the age of 63. Shortly thereafter, she emigrated to the United States, where she found a teaching position at a Jewish girls' school in Paterson, New Jersey.

Family and charitable causes
In 1950 she met and married Hermann Merkin, a German-Jewish businessman, who was twelve years her senior. They had six children and were married for almost fifty years until his death in 1999 at the age of 91. Ursula and Hermann Merkin sponsored the New York venue Merkin Concert Hall and were involved in a variety of Yeshiva University functions as well as with other Jewish philanthropies. They were also deeply devoted to Fifth Avenue Synagogue, of which Hermann Merkin was the founding President.

Ursula Breuer Merkin was a granddaughter of Solomon Breuer, a great-granddaughter of Samson Raphael Hirsch, a great-granddaughter of Eliezer Liepman Philip Prins, and mother of writer Daphne Merkin and philanthropist J. Ezra Merkin. Her brothers were Jacob Breuer, and Mordechai Breuer. She was best known for her involvement with Reuth, an Israeli charity for the elderly. She maintained a strong tie to, and a great love for, the Holy Land until her death in 2006. She was known by most as "Ullah."

Writing career
She also wrote a novel, Borrowed Lands, which was published by Rubin Mass Ltd. in 2000 in a second revised edition.

Death
She died in New York City at the age of 86 after a bout with lung cancer.

References 
Paid Notice: Deaths MERKIN, HERMANN - New York Times, March 10, 1999
YU Today, Yeshiva University, Orientation 2006, Volume 11 No. 1, p. 6
YBA On the Front, American Friends of Yeshivot Bnei Akiva, September 2006, p. 4
Daphne Merkin, She Contained Multitudes, The Jewish Daily Forward, July 28, 2006
Tim Boxer, RE'UTH - No need for compliments to honor Rabbi Sol Roth, 15 Minutes, Issue 33, February 2002
Masha Leon, The Power of the Pen, The Jewish Daily Forward, January 13, 2006
Paid Notice: Deaths MERKIN, URSULA - New York Times, July 24, 2006

External links
Paid Notice: Deaths MERKIN, URSULA - New York Times, July 24, 2006

1919 births
2006 deaths
20th-century American novelists
American people of Palestinian-Jewish descent
Philanthropists from New York (state)
Schoolteachers from New Jersey
American women novelists
Deaths from cancer in New York (state)
Mandatory Palestine emigrants to the United States
Jewish emigrants from Nazi Germany to Mandatory Palestine
German philanthropists
German women philanthropists
German women writers
Jewish American writers
Jewish American philanthropists
Jewish women writers
Writers from New York City
20th-century American women writers
Novelists from New York (state)
20th-century American educators
Educators from New York City
20th-century American women educators
20th-century American philanthropists
Merkin family
20th-century women philanthropists